The Strathfield massacre was a shooting rampage at a shopping mall in Strathfield, Sydney, Australia, on 17 August 1991. The shooter was Wade Frankum, who killed himself as police arrived at the scene. The incident left eight dead and six wounded.

Perpetrator
Wade John Frankum was born in 1958 and had worked at various occupations including as a retail assistant. In the apartment where Frankum lived alone, police found a large collection of violent literature and video copies of violent films. One of his books was a well-thumbed copy of American Psycho and although there is no direct evidence that the controversial novel had inspired Frankum, a number of suggestions that it had done so were made in newspapers . Frankum also owned a copy of Dostoevsky's Crime and Punishment. Investigators suggested that both his reading and viewing habits contributed to his motivation for the shooting.

Rampage
At around 1:00 p.m., 33-year-old Frankum went to Strathfield Plaza, a shopping mall in the Inner West of Sydney. He sat in a café called The Coffee Pot, where he drank a number of cups of coffee.

At approximately 3:30 p.m., apparently without provocation, Frankum pulled a large knife from an army surplus duffel bag and repeatedly stabbed one of two teenage girls who were sitting behind him, killing the girl.

Leaving the knife in the body of the girl, he pulled a Chinese-made SKS semi-automatic rifle out of his duffel and shot around the café, killing five more people. He then shot the café's owner dead and fled into the main area of the mall, where he killed his last victim.

Frankum ran into the rooftop car park and held a car owner at gunpoint, demanding that she take him to Enfield, a nearby suburb. Before the woman could start her car, police began to arrive on the scene with Constable Darren Stewart the first to arrive. He was shot at in his police car by Frankum from the car park rooftop, Stewart had run through the Strathfield shopping centre to engage Frankum, but, upon arriving at the carpark rooftop, Frankum shot numerous rounds into the door leading to the carpark, pinning down Stewart. Upon hearing more approaching sirens, Frankum apologized to the woman and then got out of the car, knelt on the ground, and committed suicide by shooting himself in the head.

Victims
Frankum's shooting spree lasted around 10 minutes. He killed seven people and injured six, none of them personally known to him.

Victims:

Roberta Armstrong, age 15
Robertson Kan Hock Voon, age 51
Patricia Rowe, age 37
Carole Dickinson, age 47
Joyce Nixon, age 61
Rachelle Milburn, age 17
George Mavris, age 51

Bravery award
Greg Read, 41, a father of three and Vietnam veteran, was awarded the Star of Courage for saving the lives of eight people during the rampage.

See also

 List of massacres in Australia
 List of disasters in Australia by death toll

References

Further reading
Milton, R (1993). Profile of a Mass Killer : Wade Frankum at Strathfield Plaza. Blackstone Press, Bondi Junction, NSW. .

External links
Mass and Serial Murders in Australia
Reliving an Australian massacre only a few people seem to remember

Mass murder in 1991
Massacres in 1991
History of New South Wales
Murder in Sydney
Murder–suicides in Australia
Mass shootings in Australia

Suicides by firearm in Australia
1990s in Sydney
August 1991 events in Australia
Attacks on shopping malls
Municipality of Strathfield
1991 murders in Australia
Spree shootings in Australia
1990s mass shootings in Australia
1990s in New South Wales
Massacres in Australia